Lucinda Margie Pullar (born 3 July 1998) is an Australian rules footballer and former soccer player who currently plays for  in the AFL Women's (AFLW). In the two AFLW seasons in 2022, she played for the Brisbane Lions, and in soccer, she played for the Brisbane Roar in the W-League.

Early life
Pullar was born on 3 July 1998, daughter of Rebecca and Robert, and attended high school at Somerville House in South Brisbane, a suburb of Brisbane, Queensland.

Association football
Pullar played as a midfielder for Brisbane Roar in the W-League, in the 2017–18 season. She played one game as a substitute.

Australian rules football

References

External links

1998 births
Living people
Sportswomen from Queensland
Australian rules footballers from Queensland
Brisbane Lions (AFLW) players
Brisbane Roar FC (A-League Women) players
Soccer players from Brisbane
Women's association football midfielders
Australian women's soccer players
USC Trojans women's soccer players